{{DISPLAYTITLE:C22H30N2O2S}}
The molecular formula C22H30N2O2S (molar mass: 386.551 g/mol, exact mass: 386.2028 u) may refer to:

 Oliceridine
 Sufentanil

Molecular formulas